A Night at Karlstein is a 1973 Czech historical musical film directed by Zdeněk Podskalský, based on an 1884 play by Jaroslav Vrchlický.

Plot 
The young queen Elizabeth of Pomerania waits in vain for her husband Emperor Charles IV at the Prague Castle. She travels to Karlštejn castle to meet him. There she finds out that women are banned from Karlštejn. She disguised herself as a young man so she can sneak inside the castle.

Cast 

 Vlastimil Brodský as Charles IV
 Jana Brejchová as Elisabeth of Pomerania
 Karel Höger as Arnošt of Pardubice
 Waldemar Matuška as Peter I of Cyprus
 Miloš Kopecký as Stephen II, Duke of Bavaria
 Jaroslav Marvan as Burgrave
 Slávka Budínová as Mrs. Ofka
 Daniela Kolářová as Alena
 Jaromír Hanzlík as Pešek

External links 

Noc na Karšltejně in Czech Film Heaven
Noc na Karlštejně in Czech-Slovak Film Database
Musical Theatre Karlín Website
Noc na Karlštejně in Facebook

1974 films
1970s musical films
1970s Czech-language films
Czechoslovak musical films
Films directed by Zdeněk Podskalský
Czech musical films
1970s Czech films